David Alexander McClelland was a unionist politician in Northern Ireland.

McClelland was elected as an Ulster Unionist Party member of the Senate of Northern Ireland in 1967, serving until its abolition in 1973.

References

Year of birth missing
Possibly living people
Members of the Senate of Northern Ireland 1965–1969
Members of the Senate of Northern Ireland 1969–1973
Ulster Unionist Party members of the Senate of Northern Ireland